Kurt E. Armbruster is a historian and author in Seattle, Washington.

He graduated from the University of Washington. Armbruster and his wife Cedar live in Seattle. He is a member of the Musicians' Union of Seattle Local 76-493.

His book Before Seattle Rocked discusses Seattle's musical heritage. A review in The Oregonian said: "Armbruster's book is packed with information on everything from the earliest pianos through the gold rush and Tin Pan Alley eras up through big band sounds and folk music," and that "He did a great job tracking down musicians from bygone days and gathering photos, including the smashing one of Guitar Shorty and his band on the cover."

His book Playing for Change is about the founders of the Seattle Repertory Theater, Burton and Florence James.

He's also written on the history of Seattle's railroads.

Armbruster is a musician and plays in a band.

Bibliography
Before Seattle Rocked; A City and Its Music by Kurt E. Armbruster July 2015, University of Washington Press
Playing for Change : Burton and Florence James and the Seattle Repertory Playhouse by Kurt E Armbruster, University Book Store Press 2012
Boom and Bust: The intertwined fortunes of Henry Villard and Puget Sound region, Columbia 15 (2001) pages 37–42
Orphan Road; The Railroad Comes to Seattle, 1853 - 1911 by Kurt E. Armbruster 1999
Whistle Down the Valley: 100 years of Green River Railroading by Kurt E Armbruster, Northwest Railway and Locomotive Preservation Association 1991

References

External links
A photomontage with Brewster narrating a discussion Before Seattle Rocked University of Washington Press

Year of birth missing (living people)
Living people
Writers from Seattle
University of Washington alumni
21st-century American male writers
21st-century American historians
Urban historians
Historians from Washington (state)